Rory McKay (born 2 February 1979 in Scotland) is a Scottish rugby union former footballer and now coach who played for Glasgow Warriors. He played at flanker. He played at international level for the Scotland Sevens side.

Starting his amateur career at Gordonians RFC, McKay then moved to Glasgow Hawks. In 2002, he left the Hawks to sign for the professional provincial side Glasgow Warriors. While not playing for the provincial side, he played for Aberdeen Grammar.

McKay left Glasgow Warriors in 2004 and pursued a career in rugby in Australia, Italy and England. He played for Manly in Australia; Venezia in Italy; and Waterloo and Bedford Blues in England.

The flanker also represented Scotland in their Club XV side.

He represented an invitational Caledonia Reds side versus a Co-Optimists side in effort to get the Caledonia Reds side formally re-instated by the SRU in 2014.

He is now a Rugby Development Officer and coach of Perthshire RFC.

References

External links
Glasgow Warriors
Leaving Glasgow Warriors
Glasgow Warriors fansite biography

1979 births
Living people
Scottish rugby union players
Glasgow Warriors players
Aberdeen GSFP RFC players
Gordonians RFC players
Glasgow Hawks players
Waterloo R.F.C. players
Bedford Blues players
Venezia Mestre Rugby FC players
Scotland international rugby sevens players
Male rugby sevens players
Rugby union flankers
Scotland Club XV international rugby union players